Acianthera hoffmannseggiana is a species of orchid.

hoffmannseggiana